Bill Brown (3 November 1882 – 21 September 1949) was an Australian rules footballer who played for the Geelong Football Club in the Victorian Football League (VFL).

Notes

External links 

1882 births
1949 deaths
Australian rules footballers from Victoria (Australia)
Geelong Football Club players